The Mauri River is a river of Bolivia and Peru.  It rises on the frontier between Chile and Bolivia near Charaña and flows east-northeast for about 100 km where it joins the Desaguadero.  In fact the Mauri is much larger than the Desaguadero at this point, but below the confluence the name Desaguadero prevails.

See also
List of rivers of Bolivia
List of rivers of Peru

References
Rand McNally, The New International Atlas, 1993.

Rivers of La Paz Department (Bolivia)
Rivers of Peru
Rivers of Tacna Region